The Logan Forest Reserve was established by the General Land Office in Utah on May 29, 1903  with .  In 1905 federal forests were transferred to the U.S. Forest Service. On May 28, 1906 the forest was combined with other lands to establish Bear River Forest Reserve and the name was discontinued.  The lands are presently included in Uinta-Wasatch-Cache National Forest.

References

External links
Forest History Society
Listing of the National Forests of the United States and Their Dates (from Forest History Society website) Text from Davis, Richard C., ed. Encyclopedia of American Forest and Conservation History. New York: Macmillan Publishing Company for the Forest History Society, 1983. Vol. II, pp. 743-788.

Former National Forests of Utah
Defunct forest reserves of the United States